Jalan Permatang Tulang (Malacca state route M117) is a major road in Malacca state, Malaysia

List of junctions

Roads in Malacca